The Union for the Progress of Cantabria (UPCA) was a political party in the Spanish Autonomous Community of Cantabria. The UPCA was created after Juan Hormaechea split from the People's Party in 1991.

Election results

Local elections

Cantabrian autonomous elections

General elections

References

 Full historic municipal & general election results in Spain (1977-2016)

Political parties in Cantabria
Political parties established in 1991
Regionalist parties in Spain
1991 establishments in Spain